William Vincent Lucas was the inaugural Bishop of Masasi during the first half of the 20th century.

Born on 20 June 1883 and educated at Magdalen College School, Oxford and St Catherine's Society in the same city, he was made deacon on 23 December 1906, by George Kennion, Bishop of Bath and Wells, at Wells Cathedral. After a curacy at St Michael's Shepton Beauchamp he went to Tanzania as a missionary. He was later the provost and sub-dean of Masasi Collegiate Church and a canon of Zanzibar before his ordination to the episcopate. He was consecrated a bishop on Michaelmas (29 September) 1926, by Randall Davidson, Archbishop of Canterbury, at Westminster Abbey. He died on 8 July 1945.

References

1883 births
People educated at Rossall School
Alumni of St Catherine's College, Oxford
English Anglican missionaries
Provosts of the Anglican Church of Tanzania
20th-century Anglican bishops in Tanzania
Anglican bishops of Masasi
1945 deaths
Anglican missionaries in Tanzania